Patrick O'Hagan Sings was an Australian television series starring the Irish tenor. It was produced by station ATN-7 in November 1958, and began being broadcast in early 1959. Unlike most Australian-produced series of the era, which were live, Patrick O'Hagan Sings was produced directly on film, with a total of 26 episodes made, each of which was designed to fit in a quarter-hour time-slot. Patrick O'Hagan sang songs in the series.

In Sydney the series aired on ATN-7, and aired at 3:00PM  on Tuesdays. In Melbourne, the series aired on station GTV-9 at 3:00PM on Thursdays.

The National Film and Sound Archive holds a near-complete run of the series, as 16mm picture and sound negatives.

A different series by this title aired in 1965 on ABC.

See also
Australian Walkabout - Another 1950s-era Australian-produced filmed series

References

External links
Patrick O'Hagan Sings at IMDb

Seven Network original programming
Nine Network original programming
1959 Australian television series debuts
1959 Australian television series endings
1965 Australian television series debuts
1965 Australian television series endings
Australian music television series
Australian Broadcasting Corporation original programming
English-language television shows
Black-and-white Australian television shows